Jakub Żulczyk (born 12 August 1983 in Szczytno) is a Polish writer and journalist who writes for Elle, Machina, Przekrój and Onet.pl. He lives in Warsaw.

Life and career
He graduated in journalism from the Jagiellonian University. He publishes articles in such literary magazines as Lampa and Machina. He has also worked as a columnist for the Dziennik newspaper as well as Tygodnik Powszechny and Wprost.

In 2011, he was a co-host of the Redakcja kultury programme broadcast on TVP2 channel. He also worked as a host together with rapper Sokół of Instytut prosto programme on Roxy Radio.

Żulczyk and Monika Powalisz wrote the script to the popular crime TV series Belfer.

His first book Zrób mi jakąś krzywdę... was published in 2006. He was nominated to the Paszport Polityki Award in 2014 for Ślepnąc od świateł ("Blinded by the Lights") and to the Literary Award of Warmia and Masuria in 2017. He is the winner of the 2018 Literary Award of the Capital City of Warsaw.

Legal case
On 23 March 2021, Żulczyk was charged under the Polish lèse-majesté law, Article 135 of the Penal Code, for referring to Polish president Andrzej Duda as a "moron" in online social media in the context of comments criticising Duda's description of the 2020 United States presidential election victory of Joe Biden. Żulczyk risks three years' imprisonment under the law, which the Polish Constitutional Tribunal judged to be constitutionally and internationally valid, arguing that the effective carrying out of the duties of the president requires having authority and being especially respected.

See also
 Polish literature

Bibliography
 2006 – Zrób mi jakąś krzywdę... czyli wszystkie gry video są o miłości
 2008 – Radio Armageddon
 2010 – Instytut
 2011 – Zmorojewo
 2011 – Świątynia
 2014 – Ślepnąc od świateł
 2017 – Wzgórze psów
 2019 – Czarne Słońce
 2021 – Informacja zwrotna

References

External links 
 

21st-century Polish writers
Polish journalists
People from Szczytno County
1983 births
Living people